The 99th Airlift Squadron is part of the 89th Airlift Wing at Andrews Air Force Base, Maryland.  The 99th AS directly supports the Vice President, members of the Cabinet, Congress, and other U.S. and foreign dignitaries.  The squadron flies specially configured C-37 Gulfstream V aircraft on Special Air Missions directed by Headquarters United States Air Force.

Mission
The squadron operates specially configured aircraft on Special Air Missions (SAM) directed by HQ USAF supporting the President, Vice President, and other US and foreign senior diplomats. Selectively manned aircrews are responsible for the detailed planning and execution of sensitive missions of national and international consequence. The crew establishes direct coordination with numerous agencies to include Headquarters United States Air Force, embassies, and Congressional offices. Crews conduct these global missions isolated from normal supply and command and control structures. The aircrews accomplish Special Air Missions (SAM) into unfamiliar airfields, in all weather conditions, with 99.5% reliability and often while the world is literally watching. The crews obtain diplomatic clearances and coordinate all en route support requirements essential to mission accomplishment.

Typical missions include supporting Congressional delegations sent to monitor election results in Haiti, shuttle diplomacy missions in the Balkans, missions flown in support of the 50th Anniversary of the United Nations, and the V-E and V-J Day celebrations. The 99th Airlift Squadron routinely conducts First Lady and Air Force Two missions and provides aircrew members to augment Air Force One missions.

History

World War II

The squadron was activated in August 1943 at Sedalia AAF, Missouri as an I Troop Carrier Command Douglas C-47 Skytrain squadron. After training in Missouri and later North Carolina, it was sent to Baer Field, Indiana for final equipping with aircraft, personnel and other equipment. It was deployed to IX Troop Carrier Command in March 1944 during the build-up prior to the Invasion of France.

The squadron participated in the D-Day operation, dropping 101st Airborne Division paratroops near Cherbourg Naval Base, then carried out re-supply and glider delivery missions the following day.

The squadron's aircraft flew supplies into Normandy as soon as suitable landing strips were available and evacuated casualties to England. On 17 July the air echelon flew to Grosseto airbase in Italy to prepare for operations connected with the invasion of southern France returning to England on 24 August.

Squadron moved to France in September 1944 and for the balance of the Northern France Campaign and the Western Allied invasion of Germany was engaged in combat resupply of ground forces, operating from Advanced Landing Grounds in northern France. Delivered supplies to rough Resupply and Evacuation airfields near the front lines, returning combat casualties to field hospitals in rear areas.

Demobilized in Germany after the end of the European War, was inactivated at Bolling Field, DC in early 1946 as an administrative organization.

Air Force reserve
Reactivated as a Curtiss C-46 Commando reserve transport squadron in 1949, activated as part of the Korean War mobilization in 1951. Unit personnel and aircraft were assigned as fillers to active-duty units and the squadron was quickly inactivated afterwards.

Special air missions
Reactivated by the new Military Airlift Command in 1966, replacing the Military Air Transport Service 1299th Air Transport Squadron, which was discontinued and transferred its mission, personnel and equipment to the 99th. Provided Special Air Mission VIP transport for national leadership, including Presidential transport and foreign dignitaries as required on a worldwide basis. From 1966 to 1977 and since 1988, participated in training exercises and humanitarian airlift missions at home and abroad and provided airlift support for the President and other high-ranking dignitaries of the US and foreign governments. Transported personnel and supplies to and from Southwest Asia, 1990–1991.]

On August 30, 2017, the unit's Gulfstream C-20's were retired.

Campaigns and decorations
 Campaigns. World War II: Rome-Arno; Normandy; Northern France; Southern France; Rhineland; Ardennes-Alsace; Central Europe.
 Decorations. Distinguished Unit Citation: France, [6–7] Jun 1944. Air Force Outstanding Unit Awards: 1 Jul 1966 – 30 Jun 1968; 1 Jul 1968 – 30 Jun 1970; 1 Jul 1970 – 30 Jun 1972; 1 Jul 1972 – 30 Jun 1974; 1 Jul 1974 – 31 Dec 1975; 1 Jan 1976 – 31 Jan 1977; [1 Oct 1988]-30 Jun 1989; 1 Jul 1989 – 30 Jun 1991; 1 Jul 1991 – 30 Jun 1992; 1 Jul 1992 – 30 Jun 1994; 1 Jul 1994 – 30 Jun 1996; 1 Jul 1996 – 30 Jun 1998; 1 Jul 1998 – 30 Jun 2000; 1 Jul 2000 – 30 Jun 2002; 1 Jul 2002 – 30 Jun 2004; 1 Jul 2004 – 30 Jun 2005; 1 Jul 2005 – 30 Jun 2006; 1 Jul 2006 – 30 Jun 2007; 1 Jul 2007 – 30 Jun 2008; 1 Jul 2008 – 30 Jun 2009.

Lineage
 Constituted as the 99th Troop Carrier Squadron on 25 May 1943
 Activated on 1 August 1943
 Inactivated on 27 March 1946
 Redesignated 99th Troop Carrier Squadron, Medium on 10 May 1949
 Activated in the reserve on 27 June 1949
 Ordered to active service on 10 March 1951
 Inactivated on 14 March 1951
 Redesignated 99th Military Airlift Squadron, Special Mission and activated on 27 December 1965 (not organized)
 Organized on 8 January 1966
 Inactivated on 12 September 1977
 Redesignated 99th Military Airlift Squadron on 13 September 1988
 Activated on 1 October 1988
 Redesignated 99th Airlift Squadron on 12 July 1991

Assignments
 441st Troop Carrier Group, 1 August 1943
 27th Air Transport Group, 27 August 1945
 United States Air Forces in Europe, 25 September 1945
 Continental Air Forces (later Strategic Air Command), 15 February–27 March 1946
 441st Troop Carrier Group, 27 Jun 1949 – 14 Mar 1951
 Military Air Transport Service (later Military Airlift Command), 27 December 1965 (not organized)
 89th Military Airlift Wing, 8 January 1966 – 12 September 1977
 89th Military Airlift Wing, 1 October 1988
 89th Operations Group, 12 July 1991 – present

Stations

 Sedalia Army Air Field, Missouri, 1 August 1943
 Camp Mackall North Carolina, 18 January 1944
 Baer Field, Indiana, 22 February–2 March 1944
 RAF Langar (AAF-490), England, 17 March 1944
 RAF Merryfield (AAF-464), England, 25 April 1944
 Portion of air echelon operated from Grosseto Airfield, Italy, 18 July–24 August 1944
 Villeneuve-Vertus Airfield (A-63), France, 8 September 1944
 Operated from RAF Langar (AAF-490), England, 11–24 Sep 1944
 Saint Marceau Airfield (A-43), France, 1 October 1944

 Dreux/Vernouillet Airfield (A-41), France, 4 November 1944
 Operated from Chartres Airfield (A-40), France, 14–24 Mar 1945
 Operated from Toul-Croix De Metz Airfield (A-90), France, 29 Apr-16 May 1945
 Villacoublay Airfield (A-42), France, c. 2 September 1945
 AAF Station Wiesbaden, Germany, c. 1 October 1945 – 15 February 1946
 Bolling Field, DC, 15 February–27 March 1946
 Chicago-Orchard Airport (later O'Hare International Airport), Illinois, 27 June 1949 – 14 March 1951
 Andrews Air Force Base, Maryland, 8 January 1966 – 12 September 1977
 Andrews Air Force Base, Maryland, 1 October 1988 – present

Aircraft

 Douglas C-47 Skytrain (1943–1945)
 Waco CG-4 (1943–1945)
 Consolidated C-109 Liberator Express (1945–1946)
 Curtiss C-46 Commando (1945-1946, 1949–1951)
 Douglas C-53 Skytrooper (1945–1946)
 North American AT-6 Texan (1945–1946)
 Boeing B-17 Flying Fortress (1945–1946)
 North American B-25 Mitchell (1945–1946)
 Boeing B-29 Superfortress (1945–1946)
 Beechcraft C-45 Expeditor (1945–1946)
 Fairchild C-61 Argus (1945–1946)
 Cessna C-78 (1945–1946)
 Stinson L-1 Vigilant (1945–1946)
 Piper L-4 Grasshopper (1945–1946)
 Stinson L-5 Sentinel (1945–1946)
 Republic P-47 Thunderbolt (1945–1946)
 North American P-51 Mustang (1945–1946)
 Lockheed C-140 Jetstar (1966–1971)
 Lockheed VC-140 Jetstar (1966–1977)
 Aero Commander U-4 (1966–1969)
 Beechcraft VC-6 King Air (1966–1977)
 Convair C-131 (1966–1968)
 Convair VC-131 (1968–1975)
 Douglas C-9 Skytrain II (1988–2005)
 McDonnell Douglas VC-9 (1988–2005)
 Gulfstream C-20 (1988–2017)
 Gulfstream C-37A Gulfstream V (1994–present)
 Gulfstream C-37B (2009–present)

Notes

References

Bibliography

 
 
 
 
 

Military units and formations in Maryland
099